Thomas Hall, born Thomasine Hall (c.1603 – after 1629), was an English intersex person and servant in colonial Virginia whose wearing of female attire and, on subsequent investigation, a liaison with a maid provoked public controversy in 1629. Hall was subjected to a physical inspection, and the case reached the Quarter Court at Jamestown, which ruled that Hall was both a man and a woman and must dress in male and female clothing simultaneously.

Hall's given name is typically written as "Thomas(ine)" or "Thomas/ine" in scholarly literature on the case.

Early life
According to Hall's own account, Hall was born and christened Thomasine Hall at All Saints' Church, Newcastle upon Tyne in England. Hall was raised as a female and became skilled at traditional women's crafts, such as needlework. At the age of twelve, Hall was sent to London to live with an aunt, and lived there for ten years and observed the popularity among the aristocracy of crossover male and female fashion. These trends may have influenced Hall to break away from social norms.

As a young adult in the early 1620s, Hall decided to adopt a man's hairstyle and "changed into the fashion of a man" in order to follow a brother into the all-male military service. Hall then served in the military in England and France. Hall returned to Plymouth, and earned a living for a time by making bone lace and other needlework, reverting to the lifestyle of Thomasine.

Resettlement
Around 1627, Hall donned men's clothing again, left England, and settled in Jamestown as an indentured servant. Pursuing a different work opportunity, Hall relocated to the small settlement at Warrosquyoacke, Virginia, a village of likely fewer than 200 people (during the 1620s), founded on the site of an old Indian village along the James River, and home of two tobacco plantations. Tobacco planters in need of workers preferred hiring men.

In early 1628, Hall appears to have been arrested on a charge of receiving stolen goods, though there is a slight doubt about whether this is the same Thomas Hall. Hall was living with a John and Jane Tyos. It was claimed that Hall and the Tyoses had encouraged a neighbor to commit theft and sell the stolen goods to them. The property was found in the Tyoses' house.

Local controversy
Hall was not strict about presenting consistently as male in this new environment. Hall occasionally wore female clothing, which confused neighbors, masters, and captains of plantations. When queried about wearing women's clothes, Hall replied: "I goe in womans apparel to get a bitt for my Catt", apparently meaning that it allowed Hall to have sexual relations with men. Sometimes, even when presenting as Thomasine, Hall was rumored to be having sexual relations with women. For example, stories spread that Hall had sexual relations with the maid nicknamed "Great Besse", who worked for the former governor of Virginia, Richard Bennett. This was an issue of criminal responsibility; as a male, Hall could be prosecuted for sexual misconduct with a servant. Hall accused a woman called Alice Long of spreading the rumor, but Long said that the story originated with Hall's previous employers the Tyoses.

Residents of Warrosquyoacke claimed that Hall's changes of dress and sexual relations with members of both sexes were causing disorder. Lacking a local court or church to determine gender, the authority of the distinction fell to the laypersons, more specifically the married women of the village, who claimed experience with interpreting the female body. Three women–Alice Long, Dorothy Rodes, and Barbara Hall–decided to examine Hall's anatomy. More than once, they entered Hall's home while Hall slept and observed Hall's genitalia. They decided that Hall lacked a "readable set of female genitalia" and persuaded Hall's plantation master, John Atkins, to confirm their determination. Atkins had previously claimed that Hall was female but, after inspecting Hall during sleep, agreed that Hall was male, having seen "a small piece of flesh protruding from [Hall's] body". Hall apparently claimed also to have female anatomy, described as "a peece of an hole", but Atkins and the women said that they could find no evidence of this.

Atkins ordered Hall to wear exclusively male clothing and urged the most prominent tobacco planter in the village, Captain Nathanial Bass, to punish Hall for "abuse". Bass confronted Hall and bluntly asked if Hall was a man or a woman. Hall claimed to be both, "although he had what appeared to be a small penis". Hall said that it was only an inch (2.5 cm) long and was not functional. Male incompetence was considered sufficient to determine female sex during the early modern colonial period, and Bass decided that Hall was not properly a man. This meant that Hall could not be prosecuted for debauching Besse.

The Quarter Court
The villagers decided to take the case to the Quarter Court of Jamestown, just as Christians in Europe did in similar situations. As described by Reis, a "solution consistent with scripture-based laws as interpreted by Talmudic commentaries and consonant with early modern European customs" was to make an individual choose either male or female gender.

Hall's case reached the Quarter Court on April 8, 1629. Governor John Pott presided and the court heard from several witnesses, as well as from Hall. In a departure from similar European cases, the court ruled that Hall had a "dual nature" gender, or what modern society classifies as intersex: "hee is a man and a woeman". Before Hall's time, any individual determined by court to be "man and woman" was forced to adopt either a permanent male or female identity. Instead, as punishment for Hall's previous gender ambiguity and alternating identities as a man and a woman, the court denied Hall the freedom to choose a single gender identity. Hall was forced to "goe clothed in man's apparell, only his head to bee attired in a coyfe and croscloth with an apron before him". In addition, Hall had to provide evidence of good behavior to each Quarter Court.

Nothing further is known about Hall's life or about how long the dual-gendered clothing rule was applied.

Significance
Kathleen M. Brown states that, in the early modern period, medical theorists and scientists worked under a framework that posited that the sexes were potentially mutable; women were not a separate sex but "an imperfect variant of men". They believed that male organs were tucked inside of women because they did not have enough heat to develop external genitalia. They believed that strenuous physical activity or even "mannish behavior" could cause testicles to exit from inside the vagina, explained as "evidence of Nature's unerring tendency toward a state of greater perfection". This left the work of defining the sexes to other societal institutions, which replied on "performing" gender through consistent dress, names, occupations, and sexual relationships. Hall, defying these practices by using the clothes and names of both, has been cited as an early example of "a gender nonconforming individual in colonial America".

However, early common law, consistent with canon law, held that the sex of an intersex individual (formerly termed an hermaphrodite) depended on the sex that predominates. The 12th-century Decretum Gratiani states that "Whether an hermaphrodite may witness a testament, depends on which sex prevails", while Henry de Bracton's De Legibus et Consuetudinibus Angliae ("On the Laws and Customs of England"), c. 1235, states that "A hermaphrodite is classed with male or female according to the predominance of the sexual organs."

Reis states that the novel solution required by the court was a deliberate form of punishment, "not to endorse uncertainty, but to preclude future acts of deception, to mark the offender, and to warn others against similar abomination. The dual-sexed Hall embodied an impermissible category of gender." She states that making Hall a public spectacle would have been devastating and limiting of Hall's personhood, and this radical act contradicts not only earlier legal accounts, but also later legal and medical responses to the state of being intersex ("hermaphroditism" then).

See also 
 Intersex in history
 Timeline of intersex history
 Intersex people and military service

Notes

References

External links
"Seeing to the 'I'" from the website of Colonial Williamsburg
John Demos, "Daughters of the Revolution", New York Times, April 28, 1996; a brief summary of the case in a review of Mary Beth Norton, Founding Mothers & Fathers: Gendered Power and the Forming of American Society (NY: Alfred A. Knopf, 1996)
Women & The American Story. "Life Story: Thomas(ine) Hall", Women & The American Story, edited by New-York Historical Society, 7 May 2020; a concise run-down of Thomas(ine) Hall's life story.

Year of birth unknown
LGBT people from Virginia
17th-century LGBT people
People from Newcastle upon Tyne
People from Virginia
English emigrants
17th-century American people
Intersex in history
Intersex military personnel
Intersex non-binary people
Year of death unknown
Year of birth uncertain
Historical figures with ambiguous or disputed gender identity